Mundo Civilizado is the second solo album by American musician Arto Lindsay.

Critical reception

Rock critic Robert Christgau named the album his favorite of 1997 in the annual Pazz & Jop poll published by The Village Voice and among his 10 best albums from the 1990s.

Track listing
"Complicity" – 4:07
"Q Samba" – 3:27
"Simply Beautiful" (Al Green cover) – 3:59
"Mundo Civilizado" – 4:24
"Titled" – 3:19
"Horizontal" – 3:32
"Mar da Gávea" – 2:43
"Imbassaí" – 3:18
"Pleasure" – 2:38
"Erotic City" (Prince cover) – 5:02
"Clown" – 3:50

References

1997 albums
Rykodisc albums
Arto Lindsay albums